Emma Chichester Clark (born 15 October 1955)  is a British children's book illustrator and author. She has published over 60 books and is best known for her series of picture books about a child's toy called Blue Kangaroo.

Life
Daughter of Robin Chichester-Clark and Jane Helen Goddard, Chichester Clark studied graphic design at Chelsea Art School in the 1970s. After two years working in a design studio, she studied illustration under Quentin Blake at the Royal College of Art. Her book Listen to this won the 1988 Mother Goose Award for best newcomer.

Works

Written and illustrated

 “Catch That Hat”, 1988
 Listen to this, 1987.
 Piper, 1995.
 Little Miss Muffet counts to ten, 1997.
 I love you, Blue Kangaroo!, 1998.
 It was you, Blue Kangaroo!, 2001
 Where are you, Blue Kangaroo!, 2002
 What shall we do, Blue Kangaroo?, 2002 
 No more kissing!, 2002.
 Up in heaven, 2004.
 Will and Squill, 2005.
 Goldilocks and the three bears, 2010.

Illustrated
 Boo! stories to make you jump by Laura Cecil. 1990.
 The minstrel and the dragon pup by Rosemary Sutcliff. 1993.
 Greek myths by Geraldine McCaughrean. 1993. 
 Greek gods and goddesses by Geraldine McCaughrean. 1993.
 Too tired by Ann Turnbull. 1993. 
 The frog princess by Laura Cecil. 1995.
 Something rich and strange : a treasury of Shakespeare's verse. 1005.
 Roman myths by Geraldine McCaughrean. 1998.
 Puss in Boots and other cat tales by Montena Mondadori. 2001.
 Not last night but the night before by Colin McNaughton. 2009.
 The Orchard Book of Grimm's Fairy Tales by Saviour Pirotta. 2011

References

External links

 
 Plumdog blog
 
 Emma Chichester Clark: A life in pictures, The Guardian, 6 May 2011
 Emma Chichester Clark at Answers.com
 Interview by the Federation of Children's Book Groups (March 2013)
 
 

1955 births
British children's book illustrators
British children's writers
Alumni of the Royal College of Art
British women illustrators
Living people
Place of birth missing (living people)